Uploaded and Remixed is a remix album by Icon of Coil; it was released in 2004. It was released as a 2 CD special edition, with the Shelter EP. The Uploaded and Remixed CD featured tracks from the first 2 albums, Serenity is the Devil', 'The Soul is in the Software. Shelter was originally released on the album Machines Are Us.

Track listing

Uploaded and Remixed
 Shallow Nation (2004 Version) - 4:46
 Floorkiller (2004 Version) - 5:01
 Repeat It (Apoptygma Berzerk Remix) - 6:06
 Regret (Combichrist Remix) - 5:02
 Simulated (Funker Vogt Remix) - 5:42
 Thrillcapsule (Moonitor Remix) - 4:45
 Access And Amplify (FGFC820 Remix) - 5:22
 You Just Died (Northeborn Remix) - 5:23
 Love As Blood (Implant Remix) - 7:14
 Floorkiller (Daedal Remix) - 3:53
 Disconnect (Goteki Remix) - 5:47
 Everything is Real? (Isle of Crows Remix) - 4:57
 Been There (Exclusive Track) - 6:01
 TB Memory (Exclusive Track) - 6:42

Shelter EP
 Shelter (Single Edit) - 4:00
 Shelter (OL Mix) - 5:26
 Shelter (According to Combichrist) - 5:24
 Shelter (Analogue Brain Remix) - 5:21
 Shelter (Soman Remix) - 5:09

Credits
All songs written, produced and recorded by Icon of Coil.

2004 remix albums
Icon of Coil albums